The ASEAN Inter-Parliamentary Assembly (AIPA), until 2007, the ASEAN Inter-Parliamentary Organization (AIPO), is an organization founded in 1977, which is grouped with, but formally associated with ASEAN. Its creation was initiated by Indonesia, with the support of other members of the ASEAN 5 founding members.

It met for the first time in 1978 in Singapore. It is a weak, transnational parliamentary assembly that only has consultative powers, and lacks legislative and oversight powers over ASEAN and its members.

It has over 300 members from ASEAN members. Brunei (and previously Myanmar) which does not have a legislature, attend as Special Observers to AIPA. In 2007, it changed its name from the ASEAN Inter Parliamentary Organization (AIPO) to ASEAN Inter-Parliamentary Assembly (AIPA).

Since 1979, it has held semi-regular bilateral meetings with the European Parliament.

Location Address: ASEAN SECRETARIAT, Heritage Building, 5th floor. Jl. Sisingamangaraja No. 70A Kebayoran Baru. Jakarta Selatan, Kode Pos 12110 DKI Jakarta, Indonesia.

References

External links
 AIPA home page
 AIPA Facebook

ASEAN
Organizations established in 1977
Parliamentary assemblies